Madison Avenue Hospital was a 121-bed Manhattan hospital that opened in 1950 and closed in 1976. In 1971, it was described as "a profit-making institution where abortions are performed on a large scale."

One unresolved problem with the hospital's building, noted in 1969, was that at the "16-story structure at 30 East 76th Street built in 1928, there is only one exit." The building has been converted to luxury apartments.

History
Madison opened in 1950 when Dr. Imre Weitzner "headed a syndicate that bought the proprietary hospital, then called Gotham Hospital" which was renamed Madison Avenue Hospital. By 1971, his son "Dr. Howard B. Weitzner, chief of gynecology at Madison Avenue Hospital" had opened an abortion referral service, the subject of "questioning by a legislative committee." There were other hearings regarding funding in 1974.

Loss of funding
Madison was the third of a series of hospitals closed in the mid-1970s for "life-threatening fire and health violations". Linden General Hospital and Wadsworth Hospital were the prior pair. Initially, the each lost certification, then they lost funding. As a result, it was "economically unfeasible for the hospital to stay in business."

Gotham Hospital
Gotham Hospital was planned as "a hospital for people with average incomes" with doctors "who at present are without hospital affiliations;" it later became Madison Avenue Hospital. When Gotham opened their 30 East 76th Street 16-story 121-bed hospital on November 7, 1929, affordable  care was still their focus. A group of doctors bought Gotham in 1950 and renamed it Madison Avenue Hospital.

References

Defunct hospitals in Manhattan